Cleeland is a surname. Notable people with the surname include:

Annabelle Cleeland, Australian politician
Cam Cleeland (born 1975), American football player
Peter Cleeland (1938–2007), Australian politician

See also
Cleland (surname)